Lola Brooks may refer to:
 Lola Brooks (artist) (born 1970), American artist
 Lola Brooks (actress) (1933–1985), New Zealand-Australian actress